Cusseta is a city in Chattahoochee County, Georgia, United States. It is part of the Columbus, Georgia-Alabama Metropolitan Statistical Area. The population was 11,267 at the 2010 census. The city is the county seat of Chattahoochee County, with which it shares a consolidated city-county government. Despite this, Cusseta is not coterminous with the county; it remains a geographically distinct municipality within the county.

History
Chattahoochee County was created by an act of the Georgia General Assembly on February 13, 1854. It was formed from portions of Muscogee and Marion counties and named for the river that forms its western boundary. The act appointed five commissioners to choose a site for the county seat, which they named Cusseta to commemorate the Creek Indian town that used to exist nearby.

The original courthouse is preserved at the tourist attraction of Westville in Columbus, Georgia.

Cusseta was incorporated as a city on December 22, 1855. It is still the only incorporated city in Chattahoochee County.

Cusseta briefly prided itself on having the world's tallest man-made structure, the WTVM/WRBL-TV & WVRK-FM Tower, a guyed transmission tower built in 1962 about one mile from the city. However, it was surpassed only one year later by the KVLY-TV mast in Fargo, North Dakota.

In 2003, the city and county formed a consolidated Cusseta-Chattahoochee County government.

Geography

Cusseta is located at  (32.305451, -84.776929). The city is located southeast of Columbus, Georgia along U.S. Route 280, Georgia State Route 520 (known as South Georgia Parkway), and U.S. Route 27. The three highways run northwest  to Columbus. Other highways such as Georgia State Route 26, Georgia State Route 137, and Georgia State Route 355 pass through or begin in the city.

Demographics

As of the census of 2000, there were 1,196 people, 436 households, and 316 families residing in the city. The racial makeup of the city was 60.54% White, 36.45% African American, 0.42% Native American, 0.08% Asian, 0.33% Pacific Islander, 0.50% from other races, and 1.67% from two or more races. Hispanic or Latino of any race were 1.67% of the population.

There were 436 households, out of which 37.2% had children under the age of 18 living with them, 45.4% were married couples living together, 20.9% had a female householder with no husband present, and 27.3% were non-families. 22.0% of all households were made up of individuals, and 7.3% had someone living alone who was 65 years of age or older. The average household size was 2.74 and the average family size was 3.19.

In the city, the population was spread out, with 32.2% under the age of 18, 9.7% from 18 to 24, 30.4% from 25 to 44, 18.8% from 45 to 64, and 8.9% who were 65 years of age or older. The median age was 32 years. For every 100 females, there were 99.7 males. For every 100 females age 18 and over, there were 93.6 males.

The median income for a household in the city was $25,625, and the median income for a family was $26,736. Males had a median income of $25,380 versus $19,205 for females. The per capita income for the city was $14,115. About 25.8% of families and 28.8% of the population were below the poverty line, including 37.0% of those under age 18 and 27.3% of those age 65 or over.

Education

Chattahoochee County School District 
The Chattahoochee County School District holds pre-school to grade twelve, and consists of one elementary school, a middle school, and a high school. The district has 85 full-time teachers and over 1000 students.
Chattahoochee County Education Center
Chattahoochee County Middle School
Chattahoochee County High School

Gallery

See also
 WTVM/WRBL-TV & WVRK-FM Tower

References

External links
City of Cusseta at georgia.gov
Official website of the Unified Government of Cusseta-Chattahoochee County
Cusseta School historical marker

Cities in Georgia (U.S. state)
Cities in Chattahoochee County, Georgia
County seats in Georgia (U.S. state)
Columbus metropolitan area, Georgia
Georgia populated places on the Chattahoochee River
1854 establishments in Georgia (U.S. state)